A total solar eclipse occurred on June 30, 1992. A solar eclipse occurs when the Moon passes between Earth and the Sun, thereby totally or partly obscuring the image of the Sun for a viewer on Earth. A total solar eclipse occurs when the Moon's apparent diameter is larger than the Sun's, blocking all direct sunlight, turning day into darkness. Totality occurs in a narrow path across Earth's surface, with the partial solar eclipse visible over a surrounding region thousands of kilometres wide. Totality was visible in southeastern Uruguay and southern tip of Rio Grande do Sul, Brazil.

Images

Related eclipses

Eclipses of 1992 
 An annular solar eclipse (ascending node) on January 4.
 A partial lunar eclipse (ascending node) on June 15.
 A total solar eclipse (descending node) on June 30.
 A total lunar eclipse (descending node) on December 9.
 A partial solar eclipse (ascending node) on December 24.

Solar eclipses of 1990–1992

Saros 146 

It is a part of Saros cycle 146, repeating every 18 years, 11 days, containing 76 events. The series started with partial solar eclipse on September 19, 1541. It contains total eclipses from May 29, 1938 through October 7, 2154, hybrid eclipses from October 17, 2172 through November 20, 2226, and annular eclipses from December 1, 2244 through August 10, 2659. The series ends at member 76 as a partial eclipse on December 29, 2893. The longest duration of totality was 5 minutes, 21 seconds on June 30, 1992.
<noinclude>

Inex series 

In the 19th century:
 Solar saros 140: total solar eclipse of October 29, 1818
 Solar saros 141: annular solar eclipse of October 9, 1847
 Solar saros 142: total solar eclipse of September 17, 1876

In the 22nd century:
 Solar saros 150: partial solar eclipse of April 11, 2108
 Solar saros 151: annular solar eclipse of March 21, 2137
 Solar saros 152: total solar eclipse of March 2, 2166
 Solar saros 153: annular solar eclipse February 10, 2195

Tritos series

Metonic series

Notes

References 

1992 06 30
1992 in science
1992 06 30
June 1992 events
1992 in Brazil
1992 in Uruguay